Fish Lake may refer to:

In New Zealand
 Fish Lake, Canterbury - see List of lakes in New Zealand

In the United States
Populated places
 Fish Lake, Indiana, a small town
 Fish Lake Township, Minnesota

Lakes
 Fish Lake (Minnesota), in Chisago County
 Fish Lake (Jackson County, Oregon)
 Fish Lake (Marion County, Oregon)
 Fish Lake (Aurora County, South Dakota)
 Fish Lake (Deuel County, South Dakota)
 Fish Lake (Utah)
 Fish Lake, Arkansas County, Arkansas - see List of lakes in Arkansas County, Arkansas
 Fish Lake, Conway County, Arkansas - see List of lakes in Conway County, Arkansas
 Fish Lake, Hempstead County, Arkansas - see List of lakes in Hempstead County, Arkansas
 Fish Lake, Independence County, Arkansas - see List of lakes in Independence County, Arkansas
 Fish Lake, Lawrence County, Arkansas - see List of lakes in Lawrence County, Arkansas
 Fish Lake, Little River County, Arkansas - see List of lakes in Little River County, Arkansas
 Fish Lake, Monroe County, Arkansas - see List of lakes in Monroe County, Arkansas
 Fish Lake, Independence County, Arkansas - see List of lakes in Independence County, Arkansas
 Fish Lake, Woodruff County, Arkansas - see List of lakes in Woodruff County, Arkansas
 Fish Lake, Union County, Arkansas - see List of lakes in Union County, Arkansas
 Fish Lake, Park County, Montana - see List of lakes in Park County, Montana
 Fish Lake, Pondera County, Montana - see List of lakes in Pondera County, Montana
 Fish Lake, Ravalli County, Montana - see List of lakes in Ravalli County, Montana
 Fish Lake, Sweet Grass County, Montana - see List of lakes in Sweet Grass County, Montana

See also
 List of lakes named Fish Lake
 Fish Lake Valley, Nevada and Fish Lake Valley